Denise Madeleine Bloch (21 January 1916 – 5 February 1945) was an agent working with the clandestine British Special Operations Executive (SOE) organization in the Second World War. Captured by the Germans, she was executed at Ravensbrück concentration camp.

Early life 
Bloch was born to a Jewish family (Jacques Henri Bloch and Suzanne Levi-Strauss) in Paris, France in 1916. She had three brothers. Her father and two of her brothers were French soldiers taken prisoner by the German army in 1940. Her mother, her brother Jean-Claude, and Denise then lived a clandestine life avoiding persecution as Jews by using false papers and identities. In July 1942, the Bloch family was smuggled across the border from occupied France to unoccupied Vichy France. In Lyon Denise came into contact with Jean Aron, a Jewish engineer for Citroen who was working with the French Resistance and the SOE network led by Philippe de Vomécourt.

Special Operations Executive 
Bloch was recruited in Lyon to work for the SOE. She began resistance work with SOE radio operator Brian Stonehouse until his arrest near the end of October that year.

Following Stonehouse's capture, she went into hiding until early 1943 when she was put in touch with SOE agents George Reginald Starr and Philippe de Vomécourt. She began working with them in the town of Agen, in the southern French department of Lot-et-Garonne. However, it was decided to send her to London and accompanied by another agent, she walked across the Pyrenees mountains, making her way to Gibraltar and eventually London. There, SOE trained her as a wireless operator in preparation for a return to France.

On 2 March 1944, with fellow SOE agent Robert Benoist, she was dropped back into central France. Working in the Nantes area for the Clergyman circuit, the pair re-established contact with SOE agent and Benoist's fellow racing car driver, Jean-Pierre Wimille. On 18 June, around 8.20 am, the Sicherheitsdienst (SD) raided the villa she and Benoist were staying in and arrested them. Bloch was interrogated and tortured before being sent to Germany. She was held in prisons at Torgau in Saxony and at Königsberg in Brandenburg, where she suffered from exposure, cold and malnutrition.

Bloch was eventually sent to Ravensbrück concentration camp. Sometime between 25 January 1945 and 5 February she was executed by the Germans, and her body was disposed of in the crematorium. She was 29. Lilian Rolfe and Violette Szabo, two other female members of the SOE held at Ravensbrück, were executed at about the same time. In May, just days before the German surrender, SOE agent Cecily Lefort was also executed. It is alleged that SS-Sturmbannführer Horst Kopkow was involved in the arrest and killing of these SOE agents.

Bloch's family gravesite at the Montmartre Cemetery in Paris memorialises her life and execution.

Recognition

Awards

Monuments

Britain
Brookwood Memorial as one of 3,500 "to whom war denied a known and honoured grave".
 FANY memorial (First Aid Nursing Yeomanry) in Wilton Road, Kensington.
Tempsford Memorial as one of the women of the SOE who went out from RAF Tempsford and other airfields and port to aid resistance movements in occupied Europe, 1941 - 1945
France
 Valençay SOE Memorial in Valençay, Indre, in the "Roll of Honour" of the 91 men and 13 women members of the SOE who gave their lives for France's freedom.

Notes

References
Biography of Denise Bloch at Nigel Perrin's site
Martin Sugarman (AJEX Archivist), Daughters of Yael; Muriel Byck and Denise Bloch

Bibliography

 

1916 births
1945 deaths
People from Paris
Jews in the French resistance
Female wartime spies
Chevaliers of the Légion d'honneur
People who died in Ravensbrück concentration camp
Spies who died in Nazi concentration camps
Women in World War II
Recipients of the Croix de Guerre 1939–1945 (France)
British civilians killed in World War II
French people executed in Nazi concentration camps
Female recipients of the Croix de Guerre (France)
French Special Operations Executive personnel
Recipients of the Queen's Commendation for Brave Conduct
First Aid Nursing Yeomanry people